Eurytides zonaria is a species of butterfly in the family Papilionidae. It is endemic to the Caribbean island of Hispaniola (in both Haiti and the Dominican Republic).

Description
The pale bands narrow; the 4. and 5. pale green cell-bands of the forewing continuous with the discal band, narrow, separated from one another.

References

Further reading
Edwin Möhn, 2002 Schmetterlinge der Erde, Butterflies of the world Part XIIII (14), Papilionidae VIII: Baronia, Euryades, Protographium, Neographium, Eurytides. Edited by Erich Bauer and Thomas Frankenbach Keltern : Goecke & Evers ; Canterbury : Hillside Books.  All species and subspecies are included, also most of the forms. Several females are shown the first time in colour.

External links

Butterflies of America

Eurytides
Butterflies described in 1869
Butterflies of the Caribbean
Taxa named by Arthur Gardiner Butler
Endemic fauna of Hispaniola
Arthropods of the Dominican Republic
Fauna of Haiti